The canton of Luneray is an administrative division of the Seine-Maritime department, in northern France. It was created at the French canton reorganisation which came into effect in March 2015. Its seat is in Luneray.

It consists of the following communes:

Anneville-sur-Scie 
Auppegard
Auzouville-sur-Saâne
Avremesnil
Bacqueville-en-Caux
Beautot 
Beauval-en-Caux
Belleville-en-Caux
Belmesnil
Bertreville-Saint-Ouen
Bertrimont
Biville-la-Baignarde
Biville-la-Rivière
Le Bois-Robert 
Brachy
Calleville-les-Deux-Églises
Le Catelier
Les Cent-Acres
La Chapelle-du-Bourgay
La Chaussée
Criquetot-sur-Longueville
Crosville-sur-Scie
Dénestanville
Étaimpuis
La Fontelaye
Fresnay-le-Long
Gonnetot
Gonneville-sur-Scie
Greuville
Gruchet-Saint-Siméon
Gueures
Gueutteville
Hermanville
Heugleville-sur-Scie 
Imbleville
Lamberville
Lammerville
Lestanville
Lintot-les-Bois
Longueville-sur-Scie
Luneray
Manéhouville
Montreuil-en-Caux
Muchedent
Notre-Dame-du-Parc
Omonville
Rainfreville
Royville
Saâne-Saint-Just
Saint-Crespin
Saint-Denis-sur-Scie
Sainte-Foy
Saint-Germain-d'Étables
Saint-Honoré
Saint-Maclou-de-Folleville
Saint-Mards
Saint-Ouen-du-Breuil
Saint-Ouen-le-Mauger
Saint-Pierre-Bénouville
Saint-Vaast-du-Val
Saint-Victor-l'Abbaye
Sassetot-le-Malgardé
Thil-Manneville
Tocqueville-en-Caux
Torcy-le-Grand
Torcy-le-Petit
Tôtes
Val-de-Saâne
Val-de-Scie
Varneville-Bretteville
Vassonville
Vénestanville

References

Cantons of Seine-Maritime